Stenoporpia lea is a species of geometrid moth in the family Geometridae. It is found in North America.

The MONA or Hodges number for Stenoporpia lea is 6477.

References

Further reading

 

Boarmiini
Articles created by Qbugbot
Moths described in 1968